Thomas Fydell  may refer to:

 Thomas Fydell (died 1812) (1740–1812), MP for Boston 1790–1802 and 1806–12
 Thomas Fydell (died 1814) (1773–1814), MP for Boston 1803–06